Adult blaschkitis is a rare inflammatory skin condition presenting as pruritic papules and vesicles along multiple lines of Blaschko.

See also 
 Lichen striatus
 List of cutaneous conditions

References 

Pruritic skin conditions